George Bagration may refer to:

 Jorge Bagration of Mukhrani (1944–2008), Spanish racing car driver of Georgian descent
 George Nikolaevich Bagration (1834–1882), Georgian nobleman